Manav (Sanskrit: मानव, pronounced "Maanav"/Mɑnʌv, meaning "human") is a humanoid robot developed in the laboratory of A-SET Training and Research Institutes by Diwakar Vaish (Head of Robotics and Research, A-SET Training and Research Institutes) in late December 2014. It debuted at the IIT-Bombay Techfest 2014-2015 in Mumbai.

Technical specifications 
Manav is 2 feet tall and weights 2 kilograms. It has a rechargeable Lithium polymer battery. Manav's outer body was designed in A-SET's own 3D printing laboratory and is made of Acrylonitrile butadiene styrene plastic. It has a total of 21 degrees of freedom, two of which provide head movement allowing it to nod and look around. 1 degree of freedom goes to the waist which allows it to articulate the waist movement, allowing for a more human-like movement. The Robot is also equipped with Wi-Fi and Bluetooth connectivity. It could performs various activities like walking and dancing using human voice commands. It uses a Binocular vision processing, giving it the ability to perceive depth and perspective.

References

Humanoid robots
Bipedal humanoid robots
Entertainment robots
Social robots
Robots of India